András Németh (born 12 August 1953) is a Hungarian handball coach for the Hungarian women's national team.

References

1953 births
Living people
Hungarian handball coaches
Sportspeople from Budapest